"The Golden Eggs" is the nineteenth episode of the second series of the 1960s cult British spy-fi television series The Avengers, starring Patrick Macnee and Honor Blackman, and made by ABC Weekend TV. It was first broadcast in the Teledu Cymru region of the ITV network on Friday 1 February 1963. ABC broadcast it the next day in its own regions. The episode was directed by Peter Hammond and written by Martin Woodhouse.

Plot
A burglar steals two gold-plated eggs from a laboratory not knowing that they contain a deadly virus.

Cast
 Patrick Macnee as John Steed
 Honor Blackman as Cathy Gale
 Peter Arne as Julius Redfern
 Pauline Delaney as Elizabeth Bayle
 Donald Eccles as Dr. Ashe
 Gordon Whiting as Leon DeLeon
 Robert Bernal as Hillier
 Irene Bradshaw as Diana DeLeon
 Louis Haslar as Campbell
 Charlie Bird as Hall

References

External links

Episode overview on The Avengers Forever! website

The Avengers (season 2) episodes
1963 British television episodes